"Tere Sang Yaara" is a romantic song written by Manoj Muntashir, composed by Arko Pravo Mukherjee, and sung by Atif Aslam. The song is from the soundtrack of the 2016 tragic flick Rustom.

Background

Release and success 
Song released on 6 July 2016 by Zee Music Company on YouTube. The official video has received 82 million on YouTube as of August 2020. The audio version has released over 135 million views as of August 2020.

Credits
 Guitarist – Krishna Pradhan
 Produced & mixed by – Aditya Dev
 Mastered by – Shadab Rayeen

Music video

The song's music video featured actors Akshay Kumar and Ileana D'cruz.
"In Tere Sang Yaara song, Akshay Kumar (Rustom in the film) is shown expressing the depth of his love to Ileana and the moments from the point of his proposal to Ileana and the eventual marriage.

"Bollywood Life" described the music videos visuals as beautiful.

Indian Express in its review of the music video wrote – "The song shows Akshay (Rustom Pavri) who falls in love with Ileana at first sight and expresses his love in the most subtle way. From proposing to getting married, the song gives us a glimpse of his life".

Critical reception
Times of India in its review acclaimed the visuals of the music video as well as the lyrics and composition of the song
They wrote, "The chemistry between the lead pair (Akshay & Ileana) is impeccable and beautifully complements the soulful composition by Arko. The melody is dipped in romance and emotions, with heartfelt lyrics by Manoj Muntashir which reach out to your soul instantly.This dreamy song is just the perfect love story we all dream about".

Indian Express in its review wrote – "Pakistani singer Atif Aslam has lent his voice to the soulful track, which creates magic with the heartfelt lyrics penned by Manoj Muntashir and soulful composition of music director Arko".

Charts

Week performance
The song topped the chart of "Bollywood Life" and placed at the number-one position.

References

 

2016 songs
Songs written for films
Hindi film songs
Atif Aslam songs
Songs written by Arko Pravo Mukherjee
Songs with lyrics by Manoj Muntashir
Indian songs